James (Jim) Bond (born April 24, 1949) was a Canadian football player who played for the Calgary Stampeders. He won the Grey Cup with them in 1971. He played college football at Simon Fraser University. Bond currently works as a real estate agent based in North Vancouver, British Columbia.

References

1949 births
Living people
Calgary Stampeders players
Simon Fraser Clan football players
Canadian football defensive linemen
Canadian football people from Winnipeg
Players of Canadian football from Manitoba